The onugadu is a Maldivian musical instrument made of a piece of bamboo that is scored horizontally and rasped with a stick. One source describes it as having "an eerie, gamelan-like sound."

References

Idiophones
Maldivian musical instruments
Bamboo musical instruments